WorldSkills organizes the world championships of vocational skills and is held every two years in different parts of the world. The organization, which also hosts conferences about vocational skills, describes itself as the global hub for skills.

WorldSkills brings together young people, industry, government, education, and institutions, to promote the benefits of and need for skilled trade professionals. The aims of the competition include demonstrating the advantages of learning a vocational skill, and encouraging 'parity of esteem' between vocational and academic qualifications.

The city of Kazan, Russia, hosted the 45th WorldSkills Competition in 2019. 

At the previous event, WorldSkills Abu Dhabi 2017, there were competitions in 51 skills areas with close to 1,300 young people taking part. WorldSkills Abu Dhabi 2017, took place between 15 and 18 October 2017 at Abu Dhabi, United Arab Emirates. 

WorldSkills currently has 85 Member countries and regions, most of which organize national skills competitions that help to prepare the workforce and talent of today for the jobs of the future.

WorldSkills International, formerly known as the International Vocation Training Organization (IVTO), was founded in the 1940s and emerged from a desire to create new employment opportunities for young people in some of the economies that were devastated by the Second World War.

Overview 
Governed by an international Board of Directors and administered by the WorldSkills Secretariat, WSI's mission is "To raise the profile and recognition of skilled people, and show how important skills are in achieving economic growth and personal success".

Among its main objectives are: 
 Promote the exchange between young professionals from various regions of the world.
 Exchange of skills, experience and technological innovations.
 Raise the understanding in governments, education and industry to the importance of skills training.
 Raise the awareness of youth and those who influence youth to the opportunities available in skilled professions.

Medals are awarded during the competition: gold, silver and bronze. Medallions for Excellence are also awarded to those Competitors who achieve above-average scores in their contest areas.

Competitions
The WorldSkills Competition is currently held every two years.

Previous Competitions 

By country

Future Competitions

WorldSkills Shanghai 2022 
The 46th WorldSkills event will be held in Shanghai, as confirmed by the WorldSkills General Assembly in October 2017. The event was originally scheduled for September 2021, but due to the COVID-19 global pandemic, it was decided to shift the event to 2022. The actual rescheduled date is not yet finalized but is expected to be held from 12 to 17 of October 2022, The slogan for WorldSkills Shanghai 2022 is “New Youth, New Skills, New Dream”.

WorldSkills Lyon 2024 
Lyon, France was selected as the host city for the 47th WorldSkills competition. Originally scheduled for 12-17 September 2023, it has been moved back one year due to the decision to postpone by one year the 46th Worldskills event originally scheduled to be held in 2021 due to the COVID-19 global pandemic. This will be the second time that France has hosted the WorldSkills competition, the first time being in 1995.

Medals and awards

2015 Medal Table

2017 Medal Table

2019 Medal Table

Members 

 Chinese Taipei

List of the trades represented in WorldSkills

Construction and building technology 
 Architectural Stone masonry
 Bricklaying
Cabinetmaking
 Carpentry
 Concrete Construction Work
 Electrical Installations
 Joinery
 Landscape Gardening
 Painting and Decorating
 Plastering and Drywall Systems
 Plumbing and Heating
 Refrigeration and Air Conditioning
 Wall and Floor Tiling

Creative arts and fashion 
Fashion Technology
Florist arts
Graphic Design Technology
Jewellery
Visual Merchandising/Window Dressing
3D Digital Game Art

Information and communication technology 
 Cyber Security
 Information Network Cabling
 IT Network Systems Administration
 IT Software Solutions for Business
 Print Media Technology
 Web Design

Manufacturing and engineering technology 
 CNC Milling
 CNC Turning
 Construction Metal Work
 Electronics
 Industrial Control
 Industrial Mechanic Millwright
 Manufacturing Team Challenge
 Mechanical Engineering CAD
 Mechatronics
 Mobile Robotics
 Plastic Die Engineering
 Poly mechanics and Automation
 Prototype Modelling
 Welding
 Water Technology

Social and personal services 
 Bakery
Beauty Therapy
 Cooking
 Hairdressing
Health and Social Care
 Pâtisserie and Confectionery
 Restaurant Service

Transportation and logistics 
 Aircraft Maintenance
 Auto body Repair
Automobile Technology
 Car Painting
 Heavy Vehicle Maintenance
 The list was updated to reflect the trades that were covered at the 45th WorldSkills competition held in Kazan, Russia in August 2019.

References

External links

 
Competitions
Recurring events established in 1950
1950 establishments in Spain